Apar Gupta is a lawyer and writer on democracy and technology from India. In 2019 he was elected as an Ashoka Fellow for, "creating a model for digital rights advocacy in the country that is driven by the public, for the public."

Education 

Gupta was born and raised in New Delhi, India. He attended Mount St Mary's School, obtained his B.A. (LLB) (Hons) degree from Amity Law School, and a postgraduate degree from the Columbia University School of Law.

Law Practice 

Gupta started out as a commercial litigator in the law firm of Karanjawala & Co., later merged his own firm Accendo Law Partners with Advani & Co. in 2010. He was included in the Forbes India 30 under 30 list in 2014. Gupta resigned in 2015 to start his own law chamber where he was a lawyer in notable civil liberties and constitutional cases that have digital or technology issues including Shreya Singhal v. Union of India (Section 66A), Subramanium Swamy v. Union of India (criminal defamation), Gaurav Sureshbhai Vyas v. State of Gujarat (Internet Shutdowns), Justice Puttaswamy v. Union of India (Right to Privacy and Aadhaar), PUCL v. Union of India (Surveillance Reforms), and Anuradha Bhasin v. Union of India (Internet Shutdowns). He has represented the India Chapter of Friday's for Future when their website was blocked under terrorism charges.

Digital Rights Advocacy 
He is a co-founder of the SaveTheInternet.in campaign on net neutrality and SaveOurPrivacy.in campaign for data protection and surveillance reforms. After his work on the Section 66A case, he co-authored a study to document compliance with the judgement to discover ongoing cases which continued unconstitutionally against the Supreme Court judgement. This was called, "shocking" by the Supreme Court. Gupta is the co-founder of the Internet Freedom Foundation (IFF) and was appointed its first executive director in 2018. For his work at IFF he has been awarded the Ashoka Fellowship in 2019 and is a Next Now Fellow. Gupta has filed a case as a petitioner against the Ministry of Home Affairs for disclosure of statistical data on surveillance in India. He has deposed before a parliamentary committee on the DNA Bill and before a commission inquiring into the use of Pegasus.

Writing 
Gupta authored the Commentary on the Information Technology Act which is published by LexisNexis. He writes regularly on digital and democratic rights in leading newspapers and is quoted as an expert in India. Gupta is published in reviewed journals like the Indian Journal of Law and Technology, Seminar and the India International Center Quarterly.

Awards and recognition 

 Forbes India : 30 under 30 (2014)
 Ashoka Fellowship (2019)
 Agami Shamnad Basheer Citizenship Prize : Special Mention (2020)
 ROW 100 : Global Tech's Changemakers (2022)

See also 

 Articles by Apar Gupta 

 Internet Freedom Foundation

References 

Ashoka Fellows
Ashoka India Fellows
Columbia Law School alumni
People from Delhi
Indian lawyers
Indian male non-fiction writers